Inspektor Rolle is a German television series. The first series, directed by Jörg Grünler, appeared in 2002; the second series, in 2004, was directed by Zoltan Spirandelli and comprised two episodes. Both series were produced for Sat. 1 by the Askania Media Filmproduktion GmbH.

See also
List of German television series

External links
 

German crime television series
2002 German television series debuts
2004 German television series endings
German-language television shows
Sat.1 original programming
2000s German police procedural television series